Howard Alfred Kendall Smalley (born 12 August 1942 in Waiuku) is a former New Zealand cricketer who played two first-class matches for the Auckland Aces in the Plunket Shield.

See also
 List of Auckland representative cricketers

External links
  from Cricinfo.

1942 births
Living people
New Zealand cricketers
Auckland cricketers
Sportspeople from the Auckland Region
20th-century New Zealand people